Pinckneyville is a city in and the county seat of Perry County, Illinois, United States.  The population was 5,066 at the 2020 census.  It is named for Charles Cotesworth Pinckney, an early American diplomat and presidential candidate.

Pinckneyville is the location of the Pinckneyville Power Plant, a combustion turbine generator (CTG)-type power plant run by Ameren.

Geography

Demographics

As of the census of 2000, there were 5,464 people, 1,504 households, and 920 families residing in the city. The racial makeup of the city was 71.25% White, 24.36% African American, 0.16% Native American, 0.20% Asian, 0.05% Pacific Islander, 3.77% from other races, and 0.20% from two or more races. Hispanic or Latino of any race were 4.47% of the population.

There were 1,504 households, out of which 25.6% had children under the age of 18 living with them, 47.3% were married couples living together, 11.3% had a female householder with no husband present, and 38.8% were non-families. 35.9% of all households were made up of individuals, and 18.8% had someone living alone who was 65 years of age or older. The average household size was 2.23 and the average family size was 2.90.

In the city, the population was spread out, with 14.0% under the age of 18, 15.0% from 18 to 24, 39.7% from 25 to 44, 17.4% from 45 to 64, and 13.9% who were 65 years of age or older. The median age was 35 years. For every 100 females there were 188.3 males. For every 100 females age 18 and over, there were 209.9 males.

The median income for a household in the city was $30,391, and the median income for a family was $41,574. Males had a median income of $23,402 versus $21,848 for females. The per capita income for the city was $15,601. About 8.2% of families and 11.0% of the population were below the poverty line, including 14.2% of those under age 18 and 12.1% of those age 65 or over.

History 
Perry County was formed on January 29, 1827. It was named for Commodore Oliver H. Perry. When Perry County was established, 80 acres were taken from nearby Jackson and Randolph counties; 20 acres were reserved for the county seat. On May 17, 1857, Pinckneyville (named after Charles Cotesworth Pinckney) was organized and named as the county seat. Before being organized, Pinckneyville consisted as of 1834 of a log courthouse, four stores, a tavern, and a grocery (the first store was opened in 1827); around 20 families lived in the town. 1834 was also the same year that the Perry County jail was constructed; a larger jail, which is now the home of the Perry County jail museum, was built in 1871.

During the American Civil War (1861–1865), southern Illinois was under martial law. In the years after Reconstruction, many laws were established to ensure the second-class status of African Americans. Many actions, however, were de facto laws. From 1890 to 1968, many sundown towns were established throughout the United States, including several in southern Illinois. Pinckneyville, on the other hand, was one amongst thousands of towns that, while established earlier, became a sundown town. Pinckneyville became sundown around 1928; the extant story in Pinckneyville is that a white woman was raped by a black man, so the white leadership of the town loaded the black population of the town on a bus, drove them out of town, and left them in East St. Louis; a black man, probably the alleged rapist, was lynched at the town square. However, the rape explanation is considered to be unreliable because of the vagueness of the story and because it conflicts with accounts offered by others who lived in Pinckneyville at the time. The town continued to be a sundown town; the town had a "hanging tree", though African Americans were hanged in at least three separate places; under the city limits sign, there was a sign saying "No Coloreds After Dark" that came down in the late 1960s or early 1970s. In the town cemetery's black section, there are only two grave markers, yet it is estimated that there are approximately twenty graves.

As of the 2000 United States census, 1,331 of the 5,464 residents were black, however this population total includes the inmates of Pinckneyville Correctional Center, who are mostly African-American.

Today, Pinckneyville is home to the Illinois Rural Heritage museum. In 2010, it was awarded the Governor's Hometown Award.

Education
Elementary schools in Pinckneyville include District #50, CCSD 204, and St. Bruno Catholic School. Tamaroa grade school also feeds into the high school.

Pinckneyville Community High School is the only high school serving the Pinckneyville area.  The mascot is the panther.  School colors are Columbia, Navy, and White. PCHS has longtime rivalries with DuQuoin High School and Nashville Community High School.

Pinckneyville is known for its boys basketball program, winning over 2,000 games and appearing in the State Finals Tournament 11 times (winning in 1948, 1994 and 2001).

Notable people 
 Roy Alden (1863-1937), newspaper editor and Illinois state senator
 Albert Brown (1905–2011), oldest survivor of the Bataan Death March, moved to the town in 1998 to live with his daughter
 John Dunn, former President of Western Michigan University and current Interim Chancellor of Southern Illinois University Carbondale
 Ralph A. Dunn, businessman and Illinois state legislator
 Marion Rushing (1936–2013) Professional football player (Chicago Cardinals/St. Louis Cardinals, Atlanta Falcons and Houston Oilers) and Southern Illinois University Hall of Fame inductee. 
 Hubert Shurtz (1923–2000) Professional football player played tackle for LSU, drafted by Philadelphia Eagles but traded and played for the Pittsburgh Steelers

References

Further reading
 "Legends & Lore of Southern Illinois", John W. Allen, p. 77

External links

Cities in Perry County, Illinois
County seats in Illinois
Cities in Illinois